Murdoch University is a public university in Perth, Western Australia, with campuses also in Singapore and Dubai. It began operations as the state's second university on 25 July 1973, and accepted its first undergraduate students in 1975. Its name is taken from Sir Walter Murdoch (1874–1970), the Founding Professor of English and former Chancellor of the University of Western Australia.

Murdoch is a verdant university and a member of the Innovative Research Universities. In 2018, Murdoch University was recognised as producing the most employable graduates of all Australian universities after 3 years of graduating from their courses. In 2019, the university ranked third in overall student satisfaction amongst all public universities in Western Australia.

History 
In 1962, the Government of Western Australia earmarked an area of land in Bull Creek to be the site of a future, second, state university. Integral to the planning of the creation of Western Australia's second university was the planning for the School of Veterinary Science, which was to be the first professional faculty of the new university.  It was decided that the new university would be named after Sir Walter Murdoch, a prominent local author, philosopher, and an Emeritus Professor at the University of Western Australia. When asked if he minded a new university in Western Australia being named in his honour, he was quoted as saying, "No, but it had better be a good one."

Murdoch University was formally constituted on 25 July 1973. It was opened with an inauguration ceremony on 17 September 1974. This date was chosen as it was Sir Walter Murdoch's 100th birthday. The Governor-General of Australia, Sir John Kerr, attended the ceremony as the guest of honour. Lectures began in 1975, with 510 students initially enrolled for undergraduate programs.  At the time, the young university was notable for its admissions policy of taking into consideration eligibility factors other than the school leaving exam results of students. Other universities later came to adopt this more holistic perspective of student eligibility for entrance into university education.

In late 2018, the university faced scandal subsequent to an enrolment surge of international students, many said to be “lacking English language and computing skills”. In 2019, a Four Corners investigation by the ABC found further deterioration of standards with allegations of foreign students being recruited as "cash cows".

In May 2021, the university unveiled a new brand, replacing the traditional banksia logo with a simplified "MU" logo intended to be "modern and future-focused", as well as signifying the university's commitment to being a "progressive", "free thinking" university.

Campuses 
Murdoch University has three Australian campuses : South Street Campus and Rockingham Campus in Perth, and Mandurah Campus.

South Street 
The main campus is on South Street, Perth, in the suburb of Murdoch, near the Kwinana Freeway. Most of the southern part of the university consists of paddocks of livestock, farms and renewable energy facilities.

The master plan for the campus included an open quadrangle of grass and trees, known as "Bush Court", in the northern part of Murdoch campus, which rises to the highest altitude on campus.  The library and first academic buildings flanking this court were designed by R. J. Ferguson, who also designed several buildings on the University of Western Australia campus. According to the foundation ethos of Murdoch University, there were to be no imposing buildings like the University of Western Australia's grand, Mediterranean-style Winthrop Hall, with its imposing clock tower. Rather, the architecture adopts a low-slung form redolent of a homestead, with covered walkways suggesting a hybrid veranda or cloister around the bush court. In the smaller courtyards exotic gardens, including a Chinese garden of rocks and stones, contrast with the bush court. The planting and landscaping were the work of Marion Blackwell.

Features of the campus include the Joglo Rahayu (Peace Pavilion), a semi-enclosed pavilion near the Education and Humanities building. A monument to the ongoing association between Murdoch University and Indonesian academic institutions in Java, it acts as storage for the Western Australian Gamelan Orchestra.

The university recently established three "myMurdoch Advice" locations across campus, to assist with academic support, general advice about study, wellbeing and specialist advice for international students. A newly renovated Student Hub is located off Bush Court, including a variety of food chains and seating. The university also has a tavern and a restaurant named Sir Walter's. A range of food trucks are also available via the Pop-Up Ref on the east side of the campus.

Rockingham Campus 
Opened in 1996, it is co-located with Rockingham Challenger Institute of Technology campus, and features an arts and commerce building.
The campus ceased offering undergraduate classes at the end of 2014 due to not enough students attending the campus.

Rockingham Regional Campus Community Library 
Rockingham Regional Campus Community Library, located at the Rockingham Campus, is a joint venture between the university, the City of Rockingham and Challenger Institute of Technology. Members of all of these groups have free access to library membership.

Membership entitles all patrons to access to Challenger Institute of Technology, university and public library resources at Rockingham.

Mandurah Campus 
Opened in 2004, it is home to the School of Health Professions' Bachelor of Nursing (formally Nursing and Midwifery). In Semester 2, 2015, this degree also became available for study at the South Street Campus. Murdoch University shares the campus with Challenger Institute and John Tonkin College (formerly Mandurah Senior College).

Organisation

Schools 

There are nine schools at Murdoch University:
School of Arts
School of Business and Governance
School of Education
School of Engineering and Information Technology
School of Health Professions
School of Law
School of Psychology and Exercise Science
Sir Walter Murdoch School of Public Policy and International Affairs
School of Veterinary and Life Sciences

Asia Research Centre 
The Asia Research Centre, founded in 1991, produces multi-disciplinary research in politics, political economy, modes of governance, social change, and policy making. Its distinctive contribution to the research debate is based on the proposition that these factors have their roots in broader processes of conflict and change in society that are connected to the advance of market economies.

The centre encompasses researchers from across Murdoch University. It also regularly engages in collaboration with researchers from other universities around the world.

As of 2019, the centre's director was Rikki Kersten.

Student demographics 
Murdoch University has more than 23,000 registered students, of which 37% are international students.

In November 2008 H.E. Sheikh Nahayan Bin Murbarak Al Nahayan (Minister of Higher Education and Research) opened the Murdoch International Study Centre in Dubai, United Arab Emirates.

Academic profile

Rankings 

The 2021 Times Higher Education World University Rankings has listed Murdoch University in the top 501-600 universities in the world, slipping down from 401 to 500 in previous years, placing the lowest of the four Western Australian universities. The QS World University Rankings placed Murdoch University in the top 571–580 universities in 2021. Webometrics ranked Murdoch University at No. 590 worldwide.

The university has dropped in international university league tables, notably the ‘World's Top 100 universities under 50’, having entered at 57th in 2013 and dropped to 68th position in 2017.  However, the 2018 Graduate Outcomes Survey (GOS) identified that Murdoch University graduates had the highest employability level of all Australian universities after three years of graduating, at 96.7%.  In the most recent 2019 Student Experience Survey, Murdoch University received an overall student satisfaction rating of 79.8 and a teaching quality rating of 82.3, comparable to most other universities in Western Australia, as well as receiving the second highest rating for student support of all public universities in Western Australia.

Reputation 
Murdoch University is a research-intensive institution and a member of Innovative Research Universities Australia (IRU Australia).

According to The Australian, The Graduate Careers Council of Australia found that Murdoch journalism graduates rated satisfaction with their course at a level within the top five nationally.

Murdoch University is the founder of the ACICIS (Australian Consortium for 'In-Country' Indonesian Studies) Study Indonesia program, a non-profit consortium of Australian universities that was established in 1994 to coordinate semester-long study programs at partner universities in Yogyakarta and Malang in Indonesia, for Australian university students.

The Theology programme at Murdoch was, until its controversial closure in 2021, the most integrated of any Australian University and included a full complement of staff working on-site.

The university is one of the partners in the Western Australian Pregnancy Cohort (Raine) Study, one of the largest cohorts of pregnancy, childhood, adolescence and early adulthood to be carried out anywhere in the world.

The Australian National Phenome Centre (ANPC), led by Murdoch University, is a world-leading research institute in metabolic phenotyping, as well as the only facility of its kind in the southern hemisphere. The ANPC is led by Professor Jeremy K. Nicholson, one of the most renowned academic in the areas of metabolomics. During the COVID-19 pandemic, researchers at Murdoch University were at the forefront of studying the long-term biochemistry and symptomatology of the coronavirus, including the discovery of distinct blood signatures of patients who contracted the virus.

The university's work with conservation management has including the protection of dugongs through drone-tracking devices, and the use of space technology to track movement patterns of vulnerable whale sharks. Murdoch researchers also work to protect the endangered native black cockatoos.

Murdoch was the subject of an ABC Four Corners report on selling of placements and the associated student visas to seemingly unqualified people including those who had been previously rejected for Australian visas. Subsequently, the Department of Home Affairs increased Murdoch's risk rating.

Murdoch University International Study Centres

Murdoch University Dubai 

Murdoch University Dubai is a branch campus, established in 2008 in Dubai International Academic City to cater for the expanding Dubai media and financial sectors, and support Dubai's ambitions in providing an ongoing reserve of regional graduates connected to the demands of the region's booming industries.

The campus in Dubai offers degree programs in Commerce, Information Technology and Media and postgraduate programs in Business, Human Resource Management and Education. The Degree programs are fully compatible with those offered in Perth and carry full Australian accreditation as well as being certified by the Knowledge and Human Development Authority, Government of Dubai.

Murdoch University International Study Centre Singapore 

The Murdoch University International Study Centre (MUISC) in Singapore was officially opened in June 2008 by Australian High Commissioner Mr Miles Kupa.

Notable faculty and alumni 

Glenn Albrecht  – sustainability expert and coined the term solastalgia 
Visam Ali – Maldivian politician
Cora Baldock – Sociologist, and former President of the Australian Sociological Association
Adam Bandt – Australian politician, current leader of the Australian Greens and MP for Melbourne
Sarah Bell  professor of engineering
Reg Bolton – clown
Jeremy Callaghan – actor
Craig Challen - technical diver and cave explorer, veterinary surgeon, and 2019 co-Australian of the Year
Leonard Collard – Author, Professor of Indigenous studies at University of Western Australia
Roger Cook – Australian politician in the Labor Party, current WA Health Minister 
Tracey Cross – Australian Paralympic swimmer
 Muredach Dynan - educationist and Pro Vice-Chancellor, Australian Catholic University
James Edelman – justice of the High Court of Australia and former justice of the Supreme Court of Western Australia and Federal Court of Australia
Alan Eggleston – Australian politician, former Senator for Western Australia, representing the Liberal Party
Vivienne Elanta – environmental activist
Brian Greig – Australian politician, former Senator for Western Australia representing the Australian Democrats
Kevin Hewison – Asian Studies professor
Frederic Jevons – biochemist and educator
Michael Keenan – Australian politician, member for Stirling, representing the Liberal Party
Raeesah Khan – Singaporean activist and politician
Bill Loader – Emeritus Professor of New Testament
Scott Ludlam – Former Senator for Western Australia and federal co-leader of the Australian Greens
Toby Miller – cultural and media studies scholar
Hannah McGlade – academic, human rights advocate and lawyer
Jeremy K. Nicholson – academic specialising in metabonomics
Melissa Parke – Australian politician, member for Fremantle, representing the Labor Party
Brad Pettitt – Former Mayor of the City of Fremantle, member of the WA Legislative Council, representing the Greens (WA)
Margaret Quirk – Australian politician in the WA Legislative Assembly, representing the Labor Party
Chandrika Ravi – Indian-Australian model, dancer and actress
Kim Scott – author
Sally Talbot - Australian politician, member of the WA Legislative Council, representing Australian Labor Party (Western Australian Branch)
Jan Thomas - Vice-chancellor of Massey University, New Zealand
John Turner – Australian politician representing the Nationals
Kon Vatskalis – Australian politician representing the Labor Party, current Lord Mayor of Darwin
McKenzie Wark – writer and academic
Giz Watson – Australian politician, former leader of the Greens WA
Royston Wee – (Management and Marketing) professional Mixed Martial Artist in the UFC
Barbara Wienecke – Antarctic researcher, seabird ecologist
Grant Woodhams – Australian politician representing the Nationals
Alison Xamon – Australian politician in the Legislative Council, Parliamentary leader of the Greens WA
Edmund Yeo – Malaysian filmmaker
Basil Zempilas – Broadcaster and Lord Mayor of Perth

See also 

 List of universities in Australia

References

External links 

 Murdoch University
 Murdoch University Dubai

 
Universities in Western Australia
Education in Perth, Western Australia
Educational institutions established in 1973
1973 establishments in Australia
Chiropractic schools in Australia
Seminaries and theological colleges in Australia